Daniel Mauch (c. 1477–1540) was a late Gothic German sculptor. He was born in  Ulm and died in Liège.

Further reading 
 Barbara Maier-Lörcher, Meisterwerke Ulmer Kunst, Jan Thorbecke Verlag, Ostfildern pija 2004, 
 Susanne Wagini, "Der Ulmer Bildschnitzer Daniel Mauch (1477-1540)." Forschungen zur Geschichte der Stadt Ulm Vol. 24, Ulm 1995
 Reinhardt, Brigitte (ed.): Daniel Mauch : Bildhauer im Zeitalter der Reformation. Hatje Cantz Verlag/VM, Ostfildern 2009. 
 
 Susanne Wagini. "Mauch, Daniel." In Grove Art Online. Oxford Art Online, (accessed January 1, 2012; subscription required).

External links 
 
 Entry for Daniel Mauch on the Union List of Artist Names
 
 Daniel Mauch - Bildhauer im Zeitalter der Reformation on the official website of the city of Ulm

German male sculptors
People from Ulm
1470s births
1540 deaths
15th-century sculptors
16th-century sculptors
15th-century German sculptors
16th-century German sculptors